Klappkampen (The Christmas-Present Struggle) was the 2008 edition of Sveriges Radio's Christmas Calendar. The characters are the same as in Skägget i brevlådan, the 2008 Sveriges Television's Christmas calendar, but with a different story.

Plot
Three friends, Klas, Lage and Renée live in a flat where Renée has a workshop for inventions. When Christmas approaches, Klas is asked by his brother Lage to buy a Christmas present for their mother. Having no money, he instead asks his sister Renée to build some inventions.

References

2008 radio programme debuts
2008 radio programme endings
Sveriges Radio's Christmas Calendar